Dorian Ștefan (born 13 October 1959) is a retired Romanian football midfielder.

References

1959 births
Living people
Romanian footballers
FC Argeș Pitești players
Victoria București players
Vålerenga Fotball players
Association football midfielders
Romanian expatriate footballers
Expatriate footballers in Norway
Romanian expatriate sportspeople in Norway
Eliteserien players
Sportspeople from Sibiu